The 2019 Offaly Senior Hurling Championship was the 121st staging of the Offaly Senior Hurling Championship since its establishment by the Offaly County Board in 1896. The championship began on 30 March 2019 and ended on 20 October 2019.

Coolderry were the defending champions, however, they were defeated by Belmont at the quarter-final stage.

On 20 October 2019, St Rynagh's won the championship following a 0–16 to 1–12 defeat of Birr in the final at Bord na Móna O'Connor Park. This was their 18th championship title overall and their first title since 2016.

Birr's Eoghan Cahill was the championship's top scorer with 2–83.

Results

Group stage

Table

Knockout stage

Relegation playoff

Quarter-finals

Semi-finals

Final

References

Offaly Senior Hurling Championship
Offaly Senior Hurling Championship
Offaly Senior Hurling Championship